Belianís of Greece is the eponymous hero of a Spanish chivalric romance novel, The honour of chivalry, following in the footsteps of the influential Amadis de Gaula. An English abridgement of this novel was published in 1673.
It is best known today because it was one of the books spared during the expurgation of Don Quixote's library in Chapter 6 of Part I of Don Quixote.

This book was known by the English man of letters Samuel Johnson; see Eithne Henson, “The Fictions of Romantick Chivalry”: Samuel Johnson and Romance, London and Toronto 1992, and John Hardy, "Johnson and Don Bellianis [sic]," Review of English Studies, new series, vol. 17 (1966), pp. 297–299. It is also mentioned by Edmund Burke in the general introduction to his work On Taste where it is contrasted with the Iliad as being a lower form of literature: The type of reader who "is charmed with Don Bellianis... is not shocked with the continual breaches of probability, the confusion of times, the offences against manners, the trampling upon geography; for he knows nothing of geography and chronology, and he has never examined the grounds of probability."

References

External links
 an introduction to Castilian romances of chivalry

Male characters in literature
Spanish literature
Literary characters introduced in 1673